The 1960–61 Landsdelsserien was a Norwegian second-tier football league season.

The league was contested by 54 teams, divided into a total of seven groups from four districts; Østland/Søndre, Østland/Nordre, Sørland/Vestre and Møre/Trøndelag. The two group winners in the Østland districts, Ørn and Frigg promoted directly to the 1961–62 Hovedserien. The other five group winners qualified for promotion play-offs to compete for two spots in the following season's top flight. Brann and Steinkjer won the play-offs and were promoted.

Tables

District Østland/Søndre

District Østland/Nordre

District Sørland/Vestland

Group A

Group B

Group C

District Møre/Trøndelag

Møre

Trøndelag

Promotion play-offs
Sørland/Vestland 
Results
Brann 1–1 Ulf
Ulf 2–2 Start
Start 1–3 Brann

Møre/Trøndelag
Langevåg 3–3 Steinkjer
Steinkjer 3–2 Langevåg

Steinkjer won 6–5 on aggregate and were promoted to Hovedserien.

Relegation play-offs
Våg 0–5 Vigør

Vigør won 5–0 on aggregate and were promoted to Landsdelsserien. Våg were relegated to 3. divisjon.

References

Norwegian First Division seasons
1960 in Norwegian football
1961 in Norwegian football
Norway